Simon Brainin (July 15, 1854 in Riga, Governorate of Livonia, Russian Empire – March 31, 1911 in New York) was a Russian and an American physician.

He graduated from the gymnasium in Riga; studied medicine at the universities of Dorpat and Berlin; held the position of physician of the Jewish community of Riga; and was one of the directors of the community, the last independent Jewish kahal in Russia, until this institution was abolished by the government. He was a member of the committee of the government to investigate the rights of the Jews of the city of Riga, 1885; delegate from the government of Poltava to the rabbinical conference at St. Petersburg, 1892; and a member of the Society for the Promotion of Culture Among the Jews of Russia. In 1895 he emigrated to New York City, where he became (1902) a practicing physician, and member of the county medical and German medical societies, of the Harlem Medical Association, and of the New York Historical Society.

Literary works 
Brainin is the author of:

 "Oraḥ la-Ḥayyim", a work on popular medicine, in Hebrew, Wilna, 1883
 "Der Aerztliche Führer", Riga, 1885
 "Ueber Kefyr," Vienna, 1886

and many articles in various periodicals.

See also 
 Brainin

References 

 

1854 births
Year of death missing
Physicians from Riga
People from Kreis Riga
Latvian Jews
Emigrants from the Russian Empire to the United States
American people of Latvian-Jewish descent
Physicians from New York City